Sibusiso Msomi (born 31 December 1988) is a South African professional footballer who plays for Richards Bay as a midfielder.

Club career
Msomi began his youth career at local club Bright Stars before joining the Kaizer Chiefs academy. He failed to make a first-team appearance for Chiefs and joined Platinum Stars in July 2009.

International career
Msomi was part of the South Africa squad for the 2013 COSAFA Cup  and made his debut against Namibia.

References

External links
 
 

1988 births
Living people
People from Empangeni
South African soccer players
Association football midfielders
Platinum Stars F.C. players
South African Premier Division players
National First Division players
South Africa international soccer players
South Africa youth international soccer players